Rhizoridae is a family of very small sea snails, barrel-bubble snails, marine opisthobranch gastropod mollusks. These are headshield slugs, in the superfamily Bulloidea.

Genera
Genera within the family Rhizoridae include:
 Rhizorus Montfort, 1810
 Volvulella Newton, 1891
Genera brought into synonymy
 Paravolvulella Harry, 1967: synonym of Volvulella Newton, 1891
 Volvula A. Adams, 1850: synonym of Volvulella Newton, 1891

References

  Oskars T.R., Bouchet P. & Malaquias M.A. (2015). A new phylogeny of the Cephalaspidea (Gastropoda: Heterobranchia) based on expanded taxon sampling and gene markers. Molecular Phylogenetics and Evolution. 89: 130-150

External links
 Miocene Gastropods and Biostratigraphy of the Kern River Area, California; United States Geological Survey Professional Paper 642 

Bulloidea